The Joseph Zubin Award may refer to three different psychology awards named in honor of the psychologist Joseph Zubin.

Joseph Zubin Memorial Fund Award
The Joseph Zubin Memorial Fund Award was granted by the Joseph Zubin Memorial Fund at the Research Foundation for Mental Hygiene at the New York State Psychiatric Institute. It was established by Zubin's colleagues and family to "recognize investigators who are in an early stage of their career, but have already made significant contributions to research in any area of psychopathology." The award was co-sponsored by the University of Pittsburgh Medical Center Western Psychiatric Institute and Clinic, the University of Pittsburgh School of Medicine and the VA Pittsburgh Healthcare System. The award included an honorarium and was presented until 2010.

Recipients:

Joseph Zubin Award (SRP)
The Joseph Zubin Award is a lifetime achievement award given by the Society for Research in Psychopathology. It was established in 1986 and officially named the Joseph Zubin Award in 1990.

Recipients:

Source: Society for Research in Psychopathology

Joseph Zubin Award (APPA)
The Joseph Zubin Award was established by the American Psychopathological Association in 1992 and is granted to psychologists who have "made seminal contributions to psychopathology research."

Recipients:

Source: APPA Previous Award Winners

See also

 List of psychology awards

References

American psychology awards
Medicine awards
Awards established in 1986
Awards established in 1992
Awards established in 1994
1986 establishments in the United States